The A233 highway is a highway in Nigeria. It is one of the east-west roads linking the main south-north roads. (It is named from the two highways it links).

It runs from the A2 highway near Lokoja, Kogi State to the A3 highway at Otukpa, Benue State.

References

Highways in Nigeria